Möllevången, also called Möllan, is a neighbourhood of Malmö, situated in the Borough of Södra Innerstaden, Malmö Municipality, Skåne County, Sweden. It is nearly 3,000 more than in the beginning of the 1980s but still less than the about 14,000 in 1961.

A square (Möllevångstorget) built in 1904 to 1906, a park (Folkets Park) built in 1891 and many restaurants and shops are located in the neighbourhood. Möllevångstorget is home to the most lively market in Malmö, and is also a common site for political demonstrations, particularly from the political left.

Möllevången is generally seen as a culturally and ethnically diverse neighbourhood, as well as being seen as having a 'left-wing' character. This characterisation and image is, according to researcher Christina Hansen, also one actively disseminated and encouraged by left-wing activists in the area. However, the area is also seen by some as a particularly unsafe area of an already unsafe city, notably being used as the backdrop to illustrate 'uncertainty' and social exclusion in an advertisement by the nearby municipality of Staffanstorp.

References

Neighbourhoods of Malmö